Eglish, also called Fercale (Fir Ceall) is a barony in County Offaly (formerly King's County), Republic of Ireland.

Etymology
The names Eglish (An Eaglais, "the church") and Fercale (Fir Ceall, "men of the churches") both refer to churches.

Location

Eglish is located in west County Offaly. It contains Lough Coura.

History
Eglish was territory of the Ó Maolmhuaidh (O'Molloy) of the Southern Uí Néill, prince of Firceall (Fir Cell, "men of the churches"). During its existence Firceall was the location of a number of ancient abbeys and castles. The church at Lynally (near Tullamore) formed the parish church until the foundation of parish churches at Rahan, Killoughey, Ballyboy, Drumcullen and Eglish. A number of known ancient abbeys were located at Drumcullen, Killyon, Kilcormac and Rahan.

List of settlements

Below is a list of settlements in Eglish:
Rath

References

Baronies of County Offaly